Shahveh may refer to:
 Shahveh, Markazi
 Shahveh-ye Olya, Razavi Khorasan Province
 Shahveh-ye Sofla, Razavi Khorasan Province